Gorilla is the debut album by Bonzo Dog Doo-Dah Band, originally released by Liberty Records, LBL 83056, in 1967. In 2007, EMI reissued the album on CD with seven bonus tracks.

Musical style
The album includes "Jazz, (Delicious Hot, Disgusting Cold)" which savagely parodied their early "trad" jazz roots and featured some of the most deliberately inept jazz playing ever recorded—the record company only allowed two hours of studio time per track, so it was completed in a single take to allow for the far more complex "The Intro and the Outro". The band deliberately swapped instruments to increase the degree of incompetence.

In "The Intro and the Outro" every member of the band was introduced and played a solo, starting with genuine band members, before including such improbable members as John Wayne on xylophone, Adolf Hitler on vibes, and J. Arthur Rank on gong. Other 'band members' included Val Doonican, Horace Batchelor and Lord Snooty and His Pals.

The versatility of the band is shown in the wide variety of styles parodied on the album: as well as trad jazz noted above, there is 1920s-style music ("Jollity Farm", "I'm Bored"), Beatles music of the "Penny Lane" era ("The Equestrian Statue"), lounge music ("San Francisco"), calypso ("Look Out There's a Monster Coming"), Elvis Presley ("Death-cab for Cutie"), Disney ("Mickey's Son and Daughter"), film noir ("Big Shot"), Wurlitzer ("Music for the Head Ballet"), and bubblegum ("Piggy Bank Love").

Recording
The album was recorded on a four-track tape recorder, as was typical for the UK in 1967. Due to the limited number of tracks, most of the non-band "personnel" on "The Intro and the Outro" are simply faded in and out, and few notice they are absent in the later stages of the track.

Sleeve notes (Stanshall)
"Dedicated to Kong who must have been a great bloke."

Track listing

Side one
"Cool Britannia" (Vivian Stanshall, Neil Innes) – 1:00
"The Equestrian Statue" (Innes) – 2:49
"Jollity Farm" (Leslie Sarony) – 2:29 
"I Left My Heart in San Francisco" (George Cory. Douglass Cross) – 1:04
"Look Out, There's a Monster Coming" (Stanshall) – 2:55
"Jazz, Delicious Hot, Disgusting Cold" (Bonzo Dog Band) – 3:11
"Death Cab for Cutie" (Stanshall, Innes) – 2:56
"Narcissus" (Ethelbert Nevin) – 0:27

Side two
"The Intro and the Outro" (Stanshall) – 3:04
"Mickey's Son and Daughter" (Eddie Lisbonna, Tommy Connor) – 2:43
"Big Shot" (Stanshall) – 3:31
"Music for the Head Ballet" (Innes) – 1:45
"Piggy Bank Love" (Innes) – 3:04
"I'm Bored" (Stanshall) – 3:06
"The Sound of Music" (Oscar Hammerstein II, Richard Rodgers) – 1:21

US version
The album was issued in the US on Imperial as LP-9370 (mono) and LP-12370 (stereo), but minus the track "Big Shot".  The original issue of the album had the same booklet issued with the UK album.

Bonus tracks on 2007 CD reissue
 "My Brother Makes the Noises for the Talkies"
 "I'm Gonna Bring a Watermelon to My Girl Tonight"
 "Ali Baba's Camel" previously unreleased, early version)
 "On Her Doorstep Last Night" (Hargreaves, Damerell, Tilsley)
 "Alley Oop"
 "Button Up Your Overcoat"
 "The Craig Torso Show" (I Remember You/With a Little Help from My Friends/I Left My Heart in San Francisco/Oh Carol)

Personnel

Musicians
 Vivian Stanshall – lead vocals, trumpet, euphonium, tuba, ukulele
 Neil Innes – piano, harpsichord, guitar, backing vocals, lead vocals on "The Equestrian Statue"
 Vernon Dudley Bowhay-Nowell – bass guitar, banjo, baritone saxophone, bass saxophone, whistle
 Rodney Slater – alto saxophone, baritone saxophone, bass saxophone, clarinet, trombone, bass clarinet 
 Sam Spoons – double bass, percussion, spoons
 "Legs" Larry Smith – drums, tuba, tap dance
 Roger Ruskin Spear – saxophone

Additional musicians
 Eric Clapton – ukulele ("The Intro and the Outro")

Technical
 Gerry Bron – producer 
 Lyn Birkbeck – associate producer 
 Roger Ruskin Spear – engineer
 Neil Innes – musical director
 Vivian Stanshall – cover design, liner notes

References

1967 debut albums
Bonzo Dog Doo-Dah Band albums
Liberty Records albums
Albums produced by Gerry Bron
EMI Records albums